Highway 95A, the Kimberley Highway, is a 55 km (34 mi) long alternate route to Highway 95 that passes through the city of Kimberley and the community of Ta Ta Creek.  The highway was created in 1968, when Highway 95 was re-routed from Highway 95A's current route to a path through the Fort Steele area.

Major intersections 
For south to north. The entire route is in the Regional District of East Kootenay.

McPhee Bridge

The McPhee Bridge, also known as the St. Mary's Bridge, rises high above the St. Mary River and is near the Canadian Rockies International Airport and the Shadow Mountain Golf Community. The bridge is used by over 12,000 people each day to travel between Cranbrook and Kimberley. It is right on the city boundary of northwest Cranbrook. The present Bridge was opened on September 26, 1981.

Photo gallery

References

External links 
Official Numbered Routes in British Columbia by British Columbia Driving & Transportation

095A